The canton of Brunstatt-Didenheim (before 2021: Brunstatt) is an administrative division of the Haut-Rhin department, northeastern France. It was created at the French canton reorganisation which came into effect in March 2015. Its seat is in Brunstatt-Didenheim.

It consists of the following communes:

Bartenheim
Brinckheim
Bruebach
Brunstatt-Didenheim
Dietwiller
Eschentzwiller
Flaxlanden
Geispitzen
Helfrantzkirch
Kappelen
Kembs
Kœtzingue
Landser
Magstatt-le-Bas
Magstatt-le-Haut
Rantzwiller
Schlierbach
Sierentz
Steinbrunn-le-Bas
Steinbrunn-le-Haut
Stetten
Uffheim
Wahlbach
Waltenheim
Zaessingue
Zillisheim
Zimmersheim

References

Cantons of Haut-Rhin